The 2002 US Open was held between August 26 and September 8, 2002.

Both Lleyton Hewitt and Venus Williams were unsuccessful in their title defences, Hewitt being defeated in the semifinals by Andre Agassi and Venus being defeated in the final by her younger sister Serena. It was the third of four consecutive Grand Slam titles won by Serena, all won by defeating Venus in the final. Pete Sampras, runner-up in 2001, won his fifth US Open title, and his 14th and final Grand Slam title, defeating his rival Agassi in the final in four sets.

Seniors

Men's singles

 Pete Sampras defeated  Andre Agassi, 6–3, 6–4, 5–7, 6–4
It was Sampras's 14th (and last) career Grand Slam title, and his 5th US Open title.

Women's singles

 Serena Williams defeated  Venus Williams, 6–4, 6–3
It was Serena's 4th career Grand Slam title, and her 2nd US Open title.

Men's doubles

 Mahesh Bhupathi /  Max Mirnyi defeated  Jiří Novák /  Radek Štěpánek, 6–3, 3–6, 6–4

Women's doubles

 Virginia Ruano Pascual /  Paola Suárez defeated  Elena Dementieva /  Janette Husárová, 6–2, 6–1

Mixed doubles

 Lisa Raymond /  Mike Bryan defeated  Katarina Srebotnik /  Bob Bryan, 7–6(11–9), 7–6(7–1)

Juniors

Boys' singles
 Richard Gasquet defeated  Marcos Baghdatis, 7–5, 6–2

Girls' singles
 Maria Kirilenko defeated  Barbora Strýcová, 6–4, 6–4

Boys' doubles
 Michel Koning /  Bas van der Valk

Girls' doubles
 Elke Clijsters /  Kirsten Flipkens

Notes

External links

 Official US Open website
 Archived results at SI.com

 
 

 
US Open
US Open
2002
US Open
US Open
US Open